Rukmani may refer to:

Rukmani (name)
Rukmani Kund, a reservoir surrounded by mountains in Himachal Pradesh, India
Bhama Rukmani, a 1980 Indian Tamil-language drama film
Rukmani Kalyanam, a 1936 Indian Tamil-language film

See also
Rukmini (disambiguation)